Elysian Fields Independent School District is a public school district based in the community of Elysian Fields, Texas (USA).
 
In addition to Elysian Fields, the district also serves the community of DeBerry as well as rural areas in southeastern Harrison County and northeastern Panola County.

In 2009, the school district was rated "academically acceptable" by the Texas Education Agency.

Schools
Elysian Fields High School (students Grades 9-12)
Elysian Fields Middle School (students Grades 6-8)
Elysian Fields Elementary School (students Grades PK-5)

References

External links
Elysian Fields ISD

School districts in Harrison County, Texas
School districts in Panola County, Texas